The Glands were an American indie rock band from Athens, Georgia, United States. Their first CD, Double Thriller, was self-released in 1996 and reissued on Bar/None Records in 1998. Their self-titled album was first released in 2000 on Capricorn Records and reissued on Velocette Records in August 2001.

Overview 
The Glands' unique sounds recalled a variety of influences, including the Kinks, the Who, and The Rolling Stones. The song "Livin' Was Easy" was featured in the DVD Let America Laugh by comedian David Cross. The band reunited for a brief east coast tour in late 2011, playing several dates with Yo La Tengo.

Ross Shapiro, singer, guitarist, and founding member of The Glands, died in March 2016 aged 53 of lung cancer.

Discography 
 Double Thriller, Self-released (1996) / Bar/None Records (1998)
 The Glands, Capricorn Records (2000) / Velocette Records (2001)
 Double Coda, New West Records (2018)

References

Indie rock musical groups from Georgia (U.S. state)
Musical groups from Athens, Georgia